WEJP-LP (107.1 FM) is a radio station licensed to serve the community of Wheeling, West Virginia. The station is owned by Ohio Valley PEACE. It airs a community radio format.

The station was assigned the WEJP-LP call letters by the Federal Communications Commission on August 31, 2015.

References

External links
 Official Website
 

EJP-LP
EJP-LP
Radio stations established in 2017
2017 establishments in West Virginia
Community radio stations in the United States
Ohio County, West Virginia
Marshall County, West Virginia